Department K is a 1964 spy thriller novel by the British writer Hartley Howard. It was published in the United States under the alternative title Assignment K.

Film adaptation
In 1968 it was adapted into the film Assignment K directed by Val Guest and starring Stephen Boyd, Camilla Sparv and Michael Redgrave. While the book was mostly centred in London over a few days the film opens this out by including more Continental settings and shifting from the novel's Berlin to Munich.

References

Bibliography
 Burton, Alan. Looking-Glass Wars: Spies on British Screens since 1960. Vernon Press, 2018.
 Goble, Alan. The Complete Index to Literary Sources in Film. Walter de Gruyter, 1999.

1964 British novels
British spy novels
British thriller novels
Novels set in London
Novels set in Berlin
British novels adapted into films
Novels by Hartley Howard
William Collins, Sons books